The women's 4 × 100 metres relay at the 2017 Asian Athletics Championships was held on 8 July.

Results

References

2017 Asian Athletics Championships
Relays at the Asian Athletics Championships